Wolwedans Dam is a concrete dam in South Africa located on the Great Brak River near Mossel Bay, Western Cape, South Africa. The dam is the main source of water for the municipality of Mossel Bay as well as the gas-to-liquids refinery PetroSA. The dam serves mainly for municipal and industrial water supply purposes.

Design

Completed in early 1990, it was the first in the world single center arch-gravity dam made of roller-compacted concrete fully relying on three-dimensional arch action for stability. The 70-m high dam has a vertical upstream face and a stepped downstream face at a slope of 0.5:1 (H:V). It has a constant extrados radius of 135 m and a crest length of 268 m. The non-overflow crest is 5 m wide. The dam was built of 0.25 m thick roller-compacted concrete layers with induced joints at 10 m spacing and de-bounding every 4th layer. The induced joints were grouted in winter, between July and November 1993. The reservoir was filled to capacity in 1992.

The RCC mix properties were:
 RCC density: 2,400 kg/m3
 Average 1-year RCC compressive strength:

See also
List of reservoirs and dams in South Africa
List of rivers of South Africa

Notes

References 
 Roller-Compacted Concrete Dams, ICOLD, Bulletin 126
 List of South African Dams from the Department of Water Affairs

Dams in South Africa
Dams completed in 1990
Roller-compacted concrete dams